Caculo Cahango (also spelled Kakulo Kahango, Kaculo Kahango and Kakulo-kanhango) is a commune in the municipality of Icolo e Bengo, Luanda Province, Angola.

The commune has 6,988 residents (2014).

References

Populated places in Luanda Province
Communes in Luanda Province